Morpho sulkowskyi, or Sulkowsky's morpho, is a Neotropical butterfly. It is found in Colombia, Ecuador and Peru.

Habitat

Morpho sulkowskyi is a Tropical Andes cloud forest specialist (above 800 to 1,500 meters as high as 3500 meters). Morpho sulkowskyi and Morpho lympharis are the sole Morphos occupying this habitat.

Taxonomy
Morpho sulkowskyi and Morpho lympharis may be conspecific. There are several subspecies and many forms have been described.

Subspecies

Morpho sulkowskyi sulkowskyi V. Kollar, 1850
Morpho sulkowskyi hoppiana F.W. Niepelt, 1923
Morpho sulkowskyi selenaris E. Le Moult & P. Réal, 1962
Morpho sulkowskyi sirene F.W. Niepelt, 1911

Similar species
It is very similar to, and maybe conspecific with Morpho lympharis.

Colors

The color of a Morpho sulkowskyi is white with a holographic shine to them.
Both the presence of fluorescent pigments in their wings and the nanostructure of their wings are responsible for the iridescent fluorescence of M. sulkowskyi. The major blue fluorescent pigment contributing to the fluorescence of M. sulkowskyi was found to be L-erythro biopterin, along with minor components of pterin and isoxanthopterin.

References

Further reading
 Le Moult (E.) & Réal (P.), 1962–1963. Les Morpho d'Amérique du Sud et Centrale, Editions du cabinet entomologique E. Le Moult, Paris.
Paul Smart, 1976 The Illustrated Encyclopedia of the Butterfly World in Color. London, Salamander: Encyclopedie des papillons. Lausanne, Elsevier Sequoia (French language edition)   page 234 fig.1 (Brazil) and page 235 fig. 9 as ockendeni (Peru).

External links

"Morpho Fabricius, 1807" at Markku Savela's Lepidoptera and Some Other Life Forms
Butterflies of America Images of type and other specimens.
Fiebig Photographs.
Butterfly discoverer: prince Maksymilian Sułkowski

Morpho